Spirit Dome (2004) is a collaborative album by ambient musicians Steve Roach and Vidna Obmana. It was recorded in a live studio session in Philadelphia, Pennsylvania on May 24, 2002, beginning at around 1 AM. Although there are eight tracks on the CD they are not individually titled, making Spirit Dome a single 73 minute piece of music.

The music consists of electronic drones and other treated sound sources similar to Early Man.

Track listing
 (10:23)
 (21:30)
 (11:58)
 (4:01)
 (3:59)
 (6:09)
 (8:47)
 (6:39)

References

2004 live albums
Steve Roach (musician) live albums
Projekt Records live albums